Yanaqucha (Quechua for "black lake", also spelled Yana Cocha, Yana Ccocha, Yana Jocha, Yana Khocha, Yana Kocha, Yanaccocha, Yanacocha, Yanagocha, Yanajocha) may refer to:

Lakes
 Yanaqucha (Ambo), in the Huánuco Region, Ambo Province, Ambo District, Peru, situated at the mountain Yanaqucha
 Yanaqucha (Asunción), in the Ancash Region, Asunción Province, Peru
 Yanaqucha (Bolognesi), in the Ancash Region, Bolognesi Province, Peru
 Yanaqucha (Cangallo), in the Ayacucho Region, Cangallo Province, Peru
 Yanaqucha (Huamanguilla), in the Ayacucho Region, Huanta Province, Huamanguilla District, Peru
 Yanaqucha (Huamalíes), in the Huánuco Region, Huamalíes Province, Llata District, Peru
 Yanaqucha (Huari), in the Ancash Region, Huari Province, Peru
 Yanaqucha (Huayllay), in the Pasco Region, Pasco Province, Huayllay District, Peru
 Yanaqucha (Huanta), in the Ayacucho Region, Huanta Province, Huanta District, Peru
 Yanaqucha (Junín), in the Junín Region, Peru
 Yanaqucha (Tinyahuarco), in the Pasco Region, Pasco Province, Tinyahuarco District, Peru
 Yanaqucha (Urubamba), in the Urubamba Province, Cusco Region, Peru
 Yanaqucha or Mamaqucha, in the Cajamarca Region, Peru

Mountains 
 Yanaqucha (Anta), a mountain at a small lake of the same name in the Anta Province, Cusco Region, Peru
 Yanaqucha (Canchis), a mountain in the Canchis Province, Cusco Region, Peru
 Yanaqucha (Carabaya), a mountain at a small lake of the same name in the Carabaya Province, Puno Region, Peru
 Yanaqucha (Carabaya-Melgar), a mountain on the border of the Carabaya Province and the Melgar Province, Puno Region, Peru
 Yanaqucha (Huachón), a mountain at a little lake of that name in the Huachón District, Pasco Province, Pasco Region, Peru
 Yanaqucha (Melgar), a mountain in the Melgar Province, Puno Region, Peru
 Yanaqucha (Quispicanchi), a mountain at a little lake of that name in the Quispicanchi Province, Cusco Region, Peru
 Yanaqucha (San Marcos), a mountain at a little lake of that name in the San Marcos District, Huari Province, Ancash Region, Peru

Others 
 Yanacocha, a mine in Peru